Menai Bridge Urban District (Porthaethwy UDC) is a former administrative area in Anglesey, Wales. Urban Districts were established under the Local Government Act 1894, and abolished in 1974 by the Local Government Act 1972. It was the successor to the Llandysilio Improvement Commission.

References

Urban districts of Wales
History of Anglesey
Menai Bridge